The following lists events that happened during 1972 in the Iraqi Republic.

Incumbents
 President: Ahmed Hassan al-Bakr
 Prime Minister: Ahmed Hassan al-Bakr
 Vice President: Saddam Hussein

Events

April
 9 April - The Iraqi-Soviet Treaty of Friendship and Co-operation was signed in Baghdad, for a term of 15 years, after which the USSR supplied increased military aid to Iraq, as part of an agreement "to develop their cooperation in the matter of strengthening their defence capacity".

June
 1 June - The Iraq Petroleum Company was completely nationalized by the government of Iraq, through its Public Law 69, making the company part of the state-owned Iraq National Oil Company.

References

 
Iraq
Years of the 20th century in Iraq
1970s in Iraq
Iraq